Stoddard Benham Colby (February 3, 1816 – September 21, 1867) was an American lawyer and political figure.  He is notable for his service as Register of the United States Treasury during the American Civil War.

Biography
Colby was born in Derby, Vermont on February 3, 1816. He was educated in Derby, and prepared for college by studying in the office of attorney Timothy P. Redfield.  He graduated from Dartmouth College in 1836, and was elected to Phi Beta Kappa.  He studied law with William Upham, was admitted to the bar, and practiced law in Derby.  In 1840 he was elected to a single term in the Vermont House of Representatives, and served from 1841 to 1843.  In 1846 he began to practice in Montpelier as the partner of Lucius B. Peck.

He was an unsuccessful Democratic candidate for the United States House of Representatives in 1856.

Colby was appointed Register of the Treasury and assumed office on August 12, 1864.

He was married to Harriet Elizabeth Proctor, sister of Sen. Redfield Proctor. She was one of the victims of the Henry Clay (steamboat) disaster. They had 4 children.

Colby died in Haverhill, New Hampshire following a five-week illness.  He was buried at Proctor Cemetery in Proctorsville, Vermont.

Awards and honors
In August 1867, he received the honorary degree of LL.D. from Norwich University.

References

NY Times obituary

1867 deaths
1816 births
American civil servants
People from Derby, Vermont